Jip van den Bos (born 12 April 1996) is a Dutch professional racing cyclist, who currently rides for UCI Women's Continental Team .

Major results

2014
 4th Road race, UEC European Junior Road Championships
2015
 7th Ronde van Gelderland
 8th Omloop van de IJsseldelta
2016
 1st  Young rider classification Emakumeen Euskal Bira
 6th Overall Tour of Chongming Island
1st  Young rider classification 
 8th Omloop van het Hageland
2017
 4th Omloop van Borsele
2018
 2nd 7-Dorpenomloop Aalburg
2019
 1st Le Samyn des Dames
 3rd Omloop Het Nieuwsblad
 10th Ronde van Drenthe
2020
 4th Le Samyn des Dames
 9th Omloop Het Nieuwsblad
2021
 5th Dwars door de Westhoek
2022
 9th Ronde van Drenthe
 10th Veenendaal–Veenendaal Classic

See also
 2015 Parkhotel Valkenburg Continental Team season

References

External links

1996 births
Living people
Dutch female cyclists
People from Wormerland
Cyclists from North Holland
21st-century Dutch women